The Sheboygan and Fond du Lac Railroad and its predecessor the Sheboygan and Mississippi Railroad operated the line from Sheboygan, Wisconsin through Fond du Lac, Wisconsin and terminating in Princeton, Wisconsin for one hundred years (from 1852 to 1952) and provided service to the communities along the way. Trains carried cattle, freight, lumber, coal, mail, sugar beets, produce, supplies, passengers, and the latest news. Stops along the way included Sheboygan, Sheboygan Falls, Plymouth, Glenbeulah, St Cloud, Calvary, Malone, Silica, Peebles, Taycheedah, Fond du Lac, Eldorado, Rosendale, Ripon, Green Lake, and Princeton.

Images

References

1952 disestablishments in Wisconsin
1870 establishments in Wisconsin
Defunct Wisconsin railroads
Fond du Lac County, Wisconsin
Railway companies disestablished in 1952
Railway companies established in 1870
Sheboygan County, Wisconsin